This is a list of the butterflies of India belonging to the subfamily Hesperiinae of the family Hesperiidae and an index to the species articles. This forms part of the full list of butterflies of India (Hesperiidae) which itself is part of the complete list of butterflies of India. A total of 133 species of 48 genera belonging to this subfamily are found in India.

Checklist

Actinor - veined dart

 Veined dart, Actinor radians (Moore, 1878)

Aeromachus - scrub hoppers

 Veined scrub hopper, Aeromachus stigmata (Moore, 1878)
 Dingy scrub hopper, Aeromachus dubius (Elwes & Edwards, 1897)
 Pygmy scrub hopper, Aeromachus pygmaeus (Fabricius, 1775)
 Grey scrub hopper, Aeromachus jhora (de Nicéville, 1885)
 Blue-spotted scrub hopper, Aeromachus kali (de Nicéville, 1885)

Ampittia - bush hopper

 Bush hopper, Ampittia dioscorides (Fabricius, 1793)

Ancistroides - chocolate demon

 Chocolate demon, Ancistroides nigrita (Latreille, [1824])

Arnetta - bobs

 Coorg forest hopper, Arnetta mercara (Evans, 1932)
 Vindhyan bob, Arnetta vindhiana (Moore, 1883)
 Atkinson's bob, Arnetta atkinsoni (Moore, 1878)

Astictopterus - forest hopper

 Forest hopper, Astictopterus jama C. Felder & R. Felder, 1860

Baoris - swifts

 Paintbrush swift, Baoris farri (Moore, 1878)
 Swift, Baoris penicillata (Moore, 1878)
 Figure-of-8 swift, Baoris pagana de Nicéville, 1887
 Small paintbrush swift, Baoris unicolor Moore 1873

Baracus - hedge-hopper

 Hampson's hedge-hopper, Baracus vittatus (Felder, 1862)
 Hampson's hedge-hopper, Baracus hampsoni Elwes & Edwards 1897

Borbo - swift

 Rice swift, Borbo cinnara (Wallace, 1866)

Caltoris - swifts

 Blank swift, Caltoris kumara (Moore, 1878)
 Yellow-fringed swift, Caltoris aurociliata (Elwes & Edwards, 1897)
 Colon swift, Caltoris cahira (Moore, 1877)
 Austen's swift, Caltoris cahira austeni (Moore, 1883)
 Full stop swift, Caltoris cormasa (Hewitson, 1876)
 Purple swift, Caltoris tulsi (de Nicéville, 1884)
 Philippine swift, Caltoris philippina (Herrich-Schäffer, 1869)
 Tufted swift, Caltoris plebeia (de Nicéville, 1887)
 Kanara swift, Caltoris canaraica (Moore, 1883)

Cephrenes - palm darts

 Plain palm dart, Cephrenes acalle Hopffer, 1874

Creteus - nonsuch palmer

 Nonsuch palmer, Creteus cyrina Hewitson, 1876

Cuphita - wax dart

 Wax dart, Cupitha purreea (Moore, 1877)

Erionota - redeyes

 Palm redeye, Erionota hiraca (Moore, 1881)
 Palm redeye, Erionota thrax (Linnaeus, 1767)
 Banana skipper, Erionota torus Evans, 1941

Gangara - giant redeyes

Giant redeye, Gangara thyrsis (Fabricius, 1775)
Banded redeye, Gangara lebadea (Hewitson, 1886)

Gegenes - dingy swift

 Dingy swift, Gegenes nostrodamus (Fabricius, 1793)
 Pigmy skipper, Gegenes pumilio (Hoffmannsegg, 1804)

Halpe - aces

 Ceylon ace, Halpe egena (Felder)
 Indian ace, Halpe homolea (Hewitson, 1868)
 Sikkim ace, Halpe sikkima Moore, 1882
 Banded ace, Halpe zema (Hewitson, 1877)
 Moore's ace, Halpe porus (Mabille, 1876)
 Confusing ace, Halpe wantona C. Swinhoe, 1893
 Halpe arcuata Evans, 1937
 Halpe filda Evans, 1949
 Halpe knyvetti Elwes & Edwards, 1897
 Halpe kumara de Nicéville, 1885
 Halpe scissa Cantlie, 1961

Hyarotis - flitters

 Tree flitter, Hyarotis adrastus (Stoll, 1780)
 Brush flitter,  Hyarotis microsticta (Wood-Mason & de Nicéville, 1887)
 Coorg bruss flitter, Hyarotis coorga Evans 1949

Iambrix - chestnut bob

 Chestnut bob, Iambrix salsala (Moore, 1866)

Iton - common wight

 Common wight, Iton semamora (Moore, 1866)

Koruthaialos - velvet bobs

 Narrow-banded velvet bob, Koruthaialos rubecula (Plötz, 1882)
 Bright red velvet bob, Koruthaialos sindu (C. Felder & R. Felder, 1860)
 Dark velvet bob, Koruthaialos butleri (de Nicéville, 1884)

Matapa - redeyes

 Common redeye, Matapa aria (Moore, 1866)
 Fringed redeye, Matapa cresta Evans, 1949
 Grey-brand redeye, Matapa druna (Moore, 1865)
 Black-veined redeye, Matapa sasivarna (Moore, 1866)

Notocrypta - demons

 Restricted demon, Notocrypta curvifascia (C. Felder & R. Felder, 1862)
 Spotted demon, Notocrypta feisthamelii (Boisduval, 1832)
 Common banded demon, Notocrypta paralysos (Wood-Mason & de Nicéville, 1881)

Ochlodes - darters

 Subhyaline darter, Ochlodes subhyalina (Bremer & Grey, 1853)
 Assam darter, Ochlodes siva Moore, 1878

Ochus - tiger hopper

 Tiger hopper, Ochus subvittatus (Moore, 1878)

Oriens - dartlets

 Tamil dartlet, Oriens concinna (Elwes & Edwards, 1897)
 Common dartlet, Oriens gola (Moore, 1881)
 Common dartlet, Oriens goloides (Moore, 1881)

Parnara - swifts

 Straight swift, Parnara guttatus (Bremer & Grey, [1852])

Pelopidas - dark branded swift

 Great swift, Pelopidas assamensis (de Nicéville, 1882)
 Conjoined swift, Pelopidas conjuncta (Herrich-Schäffer, 1869)
 Chinese swift or large branded swift, Pelopidas sinensis (Mabille, 1877)
 Bengal swift, Pelopidas agna (Moore, 1866)
 Large branded swift, Pelopidas subochracea (Moore, 1878)
 Dark small-branded swift, small branded swift, lesser millet skipper or black branded swift, Pelopidas mathias (Fabricius, 1798)
 Millet skipper or white branded swift, Pelopidas thrax (Hübner, 1821)

Pithauria - straw aces

 Dark straw ace, Pithauria murdava (Moore, 1866)
 Banded straw ace, Pithauria marsena (Hewitson, 1866)
 Light straw ace, Pithauria stramineipennis Wood-Mason & de Nicéville, 1887

Plastingia - spotted lancers

 Silver spotted lancer, Plastingia naga (de Nicéville, 1884)

Polytremis - swifts

 Contiguous swift, Polytremis lubricans (Herrich-Schäffer, 1869)
 Yellow spot swift, Polytremis eltola (Hewitson, 1869)
 Himalayan swift, Polytremis discreta (Elwes & Edwards, 1897)

Potanthus - darts

 Indian dart or common dart, Potanthus pseudomaesa (Moore, 1881)
 Himalayan dart, Potanthus dara (Kollar, 1844)
 Palni dart, Potanthus palnia (Evans, 1914)
 Pallied dart, Potanthus pallidus (Evans, 1932)
 Branded dart, Potanthus rectifasciata (Elwes & Edwards, 1897)
 Detached dart, Potanthus trachala (Mabille, 1878)
 Burmese dart, Potanthus juno (Evans, 1932)
 Confucian/Chinese dart, Potanthus confucius (C. Felder & R. Felder, 1862)
 Sikkim dart, Potanthus mara Evans, 1932

Pseudoborbo - swift

 Beavan's swift, Pseudoborbo bevani (Moore, 1878)

Psolos - coons

 Coon, Psolos fuligo (Mabille, 1876)

Pudicitia - spotted redeyes

 Spotted redeye, Pudicitia pholus (de Nicéville, 1889)

Quedara - dubious flitter

 Dubious flitter, Quedara monteithi (Wood-Mason & de Nicéville, 1887)
 Yellow-base flitter / golden tree flitter, Quedara basiflava (de Nicéville, 1888)

Salanoemia

 Spotted yellow lancer, Salanoemia noemi (de Nicéville, 1885)
 Maculate lancer, Salanoemia sala (Hewitson, 1866)

Scobura - forest bob

 Forest bob, Scobura cephala (Hewitson, 1876)
 Malay forest bob, Scobura phiditia (Hewitson, [1866])
 Forest bob, Scobura isota (C. Swinhoe, 1893)
 Large forest bob, Scobura cephaloides (de Nicéville, 1889)

Sebastonyma

 Sebastonyma dolopia (Hewitson, 1868)

Sovia - bicolour ace

 Bicolour ace, Sovia hyrtacus (de Nicéville, 1897)
 Chequered ace, Sovia separata (Moore, 1882)
 Graham's ace, Sovia grahami (Evans, 1926)

Stimula

 Watson's demon, Stimula swinhoei (Elwes & Edwards, 1897)

Suada - grass bob

 Grass bob, Suada swerga (de Nicéville, 1883)

Suastus - palm bobs

 Indian palm bob, Suastus gremius (Fabricius, 1798)
 Small palm bob, Suastus minuta (Moore, 1877)

Taractrocera - grass darts

 Tamil grass dart, Taractrocera ceramas (Hewitson, 1868)
 Common grass dart, Taractrocera maevius (Fabricius, 1793)
 Himalayan dark dart, Taractrocera danna (Moore, 1865)

Telicota - palm darts

 Common palm dart, Telicota colon (Fabricius, 1775)
 Pale palm dart, Telicota augias (Linnaeus, 1763)
 Linna palm dart, Telicota linna Evans, 1949
 Dark palm dart, Telicota bambusae (Moore, 1878)
 Dark palm dart, Telicota pythias Mabille

Thoressa - spotted aces

 Thoressa aina (de Nicéville, 1890)
 Thoressa cerata (Hewitson, 1876)
 Thoressa fusca (Elwes, [1893])
 Thoressa gupta (de Nicéville, 1886)
 Madras ace, Thoressa honorei (de Nicéville, 1887)
 Thoressa hyrie (de Nicéville, 1891)
 Thoressa masuriensis (Moore, 1878)
 Thoressa pandita (de Nicéville, 1885)

 Southern spotted ace or unbranded ace, Thoressa astigmata (C. Swinhoe, 1890)
 Evershed's ace, Thoressa evershedi (Evans, 1910)
 Tamil ace or Sitala ace, Thoressa sitala (de Nicéville, 1885)

Udaspes - grass demon

 Grass demon, Udaspes folus (Cramer, 1775)

Zela

 Zela zeus de Nicéville, 1895

Zographetus - flitters

 Purple and gold flitter, Zographetus satwa (de Nicéville, 1884)
 Purple spotted flitter, Zographetus ogygia (Hewitson, 1866)

See also
Hesperiidae
Hesperiinae
List of butterflies of India
List of butterflies of India (Hesperiidae)

Cited references

References

 

Hesperiinae
x
B